Svenska Historiska Föreningen is a Swedish historical society, founded in 1880. Its members include  academic researchers in History as well as students and other interested individuals. It arranges national history conferences every year, and has published the journal Historisk Tidskrift since 1881. Editorship of the journal circulates between History departments of the various Swedish universities.

External links
Historisk Tidskrift

Historiography of Sweden
History organizations based in Sweden
Organizations established in 1880
1880 establishments in Sweden